Park Min-ho (Hangul: 박민호) (born February 25, 1992 in Incheon) is a South Korean pitcher for the SSG Landers in the KBO League.

References 

SSG Landers players
KBO League pitchers
South Korean baseball players
1992 births
Living people
Sportspeople from Incheon